The 6th FINA World Junior Synchronised Swimming Championships was held July 7–11, 1999 in Cali, Colombia. The synchronised swimmers are aged between 15 and 18 years old, from 15 nations, swimming in three events: Solo, Duet and Team.

Participating nations
15 nations swam at the 1999 World Junior Championships were:

Results

References

FINA World Junior Synchronised Swimming Championships
1999 in synchronized swimming
Swimming
Jun
International aquatics competitions hosted by Colombia
Synchronised swimming in Colombia